The 1958–59 Botola is the 3rd season of the Moroccan Premier League. Étoile de Casablanca are the holders of the title.

References
Morocco 1958/59

Botola seasons
Morocco
Botola